Aglen may refer to:

 Aglen, Bulgaria, a village in Bulgaria
 Aglen, Iran, a village in Iran
 Aglen Point, a promontory in Antarctica
 Anthony John Aglen, British administrator
 Francis Aglen, British diplomat serving in China